Black Moses may refer to:

People
 Black Musa (1880–1919), Ottoman soldier
 (St.) Moses the Black (330–405), Ethiopian religious leader
 Harriet Tubman (c. 1822–1913), African-American anti-slavery activist
 David Hamilton Jackson (1884–1946), Danish W. Indies labor rights advocate
 Marcus Garvey (1887–1940), Jamaican pan-africanism leader and Rastafari prophet.

Other uses
Black Moses (album), a 1971 album by Isaac Hayes
The Black Moses, a 2014 Bahamian documentary film

See also
 Moses (disambiguation)